The International Rhine Regulation Railway was an industrial railway situated on both banks of the Alpine Rhine river to the south of its outfall into Lake Constance. Large parts of the line have been preserved. As this stretch of the Rhine forms the international boundary between Austria and Switzerland, the railway is located in both countries.

As its name suggests, the railway's original purpose was to assist in the engineering works needed to regulate the Rhine in this area - the so-called Rhine Regulation. It is constructed to 750 mm gauge ( gauge) and is partially electrified at 750 V DC using overhead lines.

See also
List of heritage railways and funiculars in Switzerland

References

External links 

 Rhein-Shauen; Museum und Rheinbänle - the society that preserves the railway

750 mm gauge railways in Austria
750 mm gauge railways in Switzerland
Heritage railways in Austria
Heritage railways in Switzerland
Railway lines in Austria
Railway lines in Switzerland
750 V DC railway electrification